Parizhskaya Kommuna is a rural locality (a selo) and the administrative center of Parizhskokommunskoye Rural Settlement, Verkhnekhavsky District, Voronezh Oblast, Russia. The population was 844 as of 2010. There are 5 streets.

Geography 
Parizhskaya Kommuna is located 27 km west of Verkhnyaya Khava (the district's administrative centre) by road. Nikonovo is the nearest rural locality.

References 

Rural localities in Verkhnekhavsky District